In 1996 the Northern Transvaal changed their name to the Blue Bulls. In the 1996 season the Blue Bulls recorded a 147-8 victory over  that remains the highest score in Currie Cup history.

Blue Bulls results in the 1996 Currie cup

Statistics

1996 Currie cup log position

1988 - 1996 results summary (including play off matches)

Northern Transvaal
1996